John Andrew Davidson, 2nd Viscount Davidson (22 December 1928 – 20 July 2012), was a British peer and Conservative politician. Regarded as a safe pair of hands, he became deputy chief whip in the House of Lords.

Background and education
Davidson was the elder son of J. C. C. Davidson, 1st Viscount Davidson, and Frances, daughter of Willoughby Dickinson, 1st Baron Dickinson. He was educated at Westminster School and Pembroke College, Cambridge. Between 1947 and 1949 he served in the Black Watch and the 5th Battalion of the King's African Rifles before going up to Pembroke College, Cambridge, where he was known for his thespian talents, being president of the Footlights in 1951. In 1960 he embarked on a 15-year career in large-scale farming, as a director of Strutt and Parker (Farms) and Lord Rayleigh Farms. By 1965 he was on the council of the Country Landowners Association (now the Country Land & Business Association). In 1966 he was appointed chairman of the Royal Eastern Counties Hospital for the mentally handicapped at Colchester, a job he considered the "most frustrating" of his life. Tensions with the regional hospital board which was ultimately responsible for the hospital boiled over in 1971, ostensibly because of the way Mauritian employees had been treated, and the following March the board sacked five members of the management committee.

Political career
Davidson entered the House of Lords on the death of his father in 1970. He served in the Conservative administrations of Margaret Thatcher and John Major as a Lord-in-waiting between 1985 and 1986. An agile mind and a winning manner enabled Andrew Davidson to carry out the demanding duties of Deputy Chief Whip in the House of Lords for six years, 1986–92, with skill and marked success. As Deputy Chief Whip, he held the ancient but purely nominal office of Captain of the Yeomen of the Guard. He lost his seat in Parliament after the passing of the House of Lords Act 1999, commenting: "I am getting on and maybe the younger generation should get a shot at it."

Family
Lord Davidson was married twice. He married firstly Margaret Birgitta, daughter of Major-General Cyril Henry Norton, in 1956. They had four daughters (one of whom, Hon. Alexandra Oldfield, is deceased) but were divorced in 1974. His second daughter Hon. Caroline Davidson was married to Lord Edward Alexander Somerset, second son of David Somerset, 11th Duke of Beaufort. Lord Davidson married secondly Pamela Joy (now deceased), daughter of John Vergette, in 1975. They had no children.

Viscount Davidson died on 20 July 2012 at the age of 83 and was succeeded by his brother Malcolm William Mackenzie Davidson, 3rd Viscount Davidson (1934-2019), also a Pembroke alumnus.

Arms

References

External links

1928 births
2012 deaths
Alumni of Pembroke College, Cambridge
Black Watch officers
Conservative Party (UK) Baronesses- and Lords-in-Waiting
King's African Rifles officers
People educated at Westminster School, London
Viscounts in the Peerage of the United Kingdom
20th-century British Army personnel
Sons of life peers
Davidson